Elections to Metropolitan Borough of Bermondsey were held in 1949.

The borough had 12 wards which returned between 3 and 6 members. Of the 12 wards 3 of the wards had all candidates elected unopposed. Labour won all the seats, the Conservatives only stood in 5 wards, the Liberal Party in 3 wards and the Communist Party in 1 ward.

Election result

|}

References

Council elections in the London Borough of Southwark
1949 in London
1949 English local elections
Bermondsey